Moyra "Molly" Eileen Hiscox (born 27 April 1937) is a retired British middle distance runner who was a member of the Spartan Ladies club.

Athletics career
She broke the world record in 440 yards in an invitation race at the White City Stadium, London on 2 August 1958.

Hiscox competed for England in the 1958 Commonwealth Games finishing fourth in the 220 yards semi final.

References

1937 births
Living people
English female sprinters
Athletes (track and field) at the 1958 British Empire and Commonwealth Games
Commonwealth Games competitors for England